Justice Woods may refer to:

United States Supreme Court
William Burnham Woods, associate justice of the United States Supreme Court

Other United States courts
Andrew Salter Woods, associate justice of the New Hampshire Supreme Court
Charles Albert Woods (1852–1925), justice of the Supreme Court of South Carolina
Henry Woods (judge) (1918–2002), special associate justice of the Arkansas Supreme Court
Homer B. Woods, associate justice of the Supreme Court of Appeals of West Virginia
Samuel Woods (West Virginia politician), associate justice of the Supreme Court of Appeals of West Virginia
Thomas H. Woods, chief justice of the Supreme Court of Mississippi
William Allen Woods, associate justice of the Supreme Court of Indiana

See also
 Judge Woods (disambiguation)
 Justice Wood (disambiguation)